Trafalgar Square is a square in central London, England that commemorates the Battle of Trafalgar.

Trafalgar Square may also refer to:
 Trafalgar Square, a painting by Piet Mondrian
 National Heroes Square in Barbados, formerly known as Trafalgar Square
 Trafalgar Square Publishing, a publishing house and distribution company specialising in UK publishers